Steel Serpent (Davos) is a fictional character, a supervillain appearing in American comic books published by Marvel Comics. The character is usually depicted as an enemy of Iron Fist.

Davos was portrayed by Sacha Dhawan in the Marvel Cinematic Universe television series Iron Fist.

Publication history
The first, otherwise unnamed, Steel Serpent appeared in The Deadly Hands of Kung Fu #10 (1974), his only appearance, and was created by Tony Isabella and Frank McLaughlin.

The second Steel Serpent, Davos, debuted in Iron Fist #1 (1975) and was created by Chris Claremont and John Byrne.

Fictional character biography
The Steel Serpent is a native of K'un-L'un named Davos, the son of Lei Kung the Thunderer. A gifted student of the martial arts, Davos was one of the final two candidates for the right to challenge for the power of the Iron Fist but was defeated in single combat by Wendell Rand, adopted son of K'un-L'un's ruler, Lord Tuan. Davos accused Tuan of unfairly favoring his son and left the city without permission to confront the dragon Shou-Lao. Failing to defeat the dragon, he returned to K'un L'un in disgrace and was exiled to Earth. Wendell Rand left K'un-L'un the same day without having confronted the dragon. Twenty years later, Wendell's son Daniel Rand succeeded in winning the Iron Fist power and soon afterwards also returned to Earth. Davos tracked Iron Fist to New York and stole his power, possessing it until it consumed him and Iron Fist absorbed it back into himself.

Davos' spirit was cast into a realm accessible from the Anomaly Gem, and through that Davos used the Contemplator to gather the fragments of the Anomaly Gem and release himself.  Then, he again battled Iron Fist and stole his power; Davos then returned to K'un-L'un and took over the city. Lei Kung allied with Iron Fist, who defeated Davos and restored Yu-Ti's rule.

The Immortal Iron Fist

Davos was restored by the Crane Mother, promising to locate and destroy the renegade Iron Fist Orson Randall in return. His power was further enhanced via the consumption of the life forces of the Crane Mother's daughters. Davos allied with HYDRA against Iron Fist in a plot to obtain Rand-Meachum's Randrapid train to build a tunnel through the K'un-Lun mountains.  Davos located Randall in an opium den in Bangkok, Thailand and reported this to the Crane Mother, who sent a pair of her daughters to investigate. Agents of Davos, posing as NYPD, picked up Randall as he arrived in a US airport, but Randall determined the truth and broke free. Davos met with Xao, spokesman for HYDRA's front company, Wai-Go, expressing his displeasure at HYDRA's failure. After slaying a HYDRA agent who had failed to engage Iron Fist, Davos sent other agents to bring in both Orson Randall and Daniel Rand. Slaughtering a group of HYDRA agents in a training session, Davos then took out two whole legions of HYDRA agents and destroyed a Mechagorgon. He then contacted the Crane Mother, asking for a dozen or more daughters to allow him to reach his power's peak to stop his foes. Crane Mother agreed to the request.

Crane Mother sent over a dozen daughters to Steel Serpent, along with the warning that if he failed, they would consume his immortal soul. Davos led HYDRA agents and the Crane daughters to Rand Corporation HQ to kidnap Jerryn Hogarth for Xao, but Luke Cage and the Daughters of the Dragon were already there to protect Hogarth. When the Iron Fists arrived outside Rand HQ, they were confronted in the street by Davos' army. Maintaining his power by consuming the Crane daughters' life forces, Davos eventually attacked Orson Randall, who let Davos kill him so he would not have to keep running (or so he said at the time but his true motivation would only be revealed much later). Randall gave Rand his chi, enabling him to drive off Davos, who vowed to face him again in the Tournament of the Heavenly Cities.

When it was Davos' time to enter the tournament, he was approached by the Prince of Orphans to reveal his new Warrior's name since he was representing Kun-Zi for the first time, to which he chose "the Steel Phoenix". Davos now displays wings at either side of his serpent tattoo to mirror this.

Early in the tournament, Davos faced Tiger's Beautiful Daughter. During the contest, she severed Davos' hand. Enraged, Davos concentrated his chi into a new hand and proceeded to viciously beat his opponent to near-death, even refusing to let her yield. The next day, the old and wise Prince of Orphans challenged Davos to a fight instead of his scheduled opponent, Fat Cobra. Davos accepted and watched as his opponent turned into a green mist of chi and was swiftly dispatched by the old fighter, who then declared such brutal tactics as Davos' would not be acceptable for future matches.

Later, Davos took part in the rebellion of K'un-L'un, after his father forced him to recognise the potential treachery of his allies by asking him to consider the possibility that there might another angle that he had not anticipated rather than constantly assuming that he was always right. He helped defeat Yu-Ti, leader of K'un-L'un, and began a process of redeeming himself in the eyes of his peers. His father, Lei Kung the Thunderer, who has taken over leadership of K'un-L'un, charged him with guarding a dragon egg, from which Shou-Lao the Undying shall be reborn for the next Iron Fist to fight.

Powers and abilities
The Steel Serpent is a master of the martial arts of K'un-Lun, including those practiced millennia ago. His skills rival those of Iron Fist, and he has defeated him several times in combat, though usually with the element of surprise on his side. He is very strong, fast, agile and tough with lightning quick reflexes and reactions. He has proved capable of draining the power of the Iron Fist (the energies of Shou-Lao) from its wielder by pressing his serpentine tattoo against the wielder's dragon tattoo. On at least one occasion he retained some fragment of Shou-Lao's power after the previous holder of the Iron Fist had reclaimed his power. At his full power he has weathered assaults from the superhumanly powerful Spider-Man.

Davos also utilized the fiery energies of the Serpent's Sting, though that may be a function of the taloned gloves he wore at the time. When slain, Davos's spirit is transferred into the Anomaly Gem alongside the spirits of all past Iron Fists. From there he can be resurrected under certain circumstances.

Since taking on the nom de guerre of the Steel Phoenix, Davos has been able to perform the Steel Phoenix Blow. The first time he executed this move, he created a replacement hand (for the one just cut off by Tiger's Beautiful Daughter) out of pure chi.

In other media

Television
 Davos makes his onscreen debut in season 1 of Iron Fist, portrayed by Sacha Dhawan while his younger self is portrayed by Shiv Pai. While he initially was sent to retrieve Danny after he left K'un-Lun, Davos has a major falling out with Danny due to his envy over him becoming the Iron Fist and straying from his destined purpose. In the season finale, Davos allies himself with Joy Meachum. In season two, Davos works with Mary Walker to abduct Danny and steal the Iron Fist chi from him with help from the Crane Sisters. After getting the chi, Davos, now the Steel Serpent, starts attacking the Triad members. After the ritual is reversed, Davos is nearly killed by Walker until Danny and Misty intervene. Steel Serpent proceeds to fight both Danny and Colleen in the streets of Chinatown. Upon Colleen channeling her own Iron Fist chi, Steel Serpent is defeated and arrested by Misty Knight. As he is taken away, Davos vows revenge on Danny.

Video games
 Steel Serpent appears as a playable character in Lego Marvel Super Heroes 2, with Sacha Dhawan reprising the role. When Iron Fist, Spider-Man, and Ms. Marvel enter the Cave of the Dragon in K'un-L'un, they find Steel Serpent next to the Dragon's Heart where a fragment of the Nexus of All Realities is which causes Steel Serpent to control Shou-Lao. After Steel Serpent is defeated, Iron Fist claims the Nexus fragment which frees Shou-Lou from its control.

References

External links
Steel Serpent (Davos) at the Marvel Universe
Steel Serpent (Davos) at the Marvel Database Project

Steel Serpent (unnamed) at the Marvel Database Project

Characters created by Chris Claremont
Characters created by John Byrne (comics)
Characters created by Tony Isabella
Comics characters introduced in 1974
Comics characters introduced in 1975
Iron Fist (comics)
Marvel Comics martial artists